Warren Louis Boudreaux (January 25, 1918 – October 6, 1997) was an American prelate of the Roman Catholic Church. He served as the first bishop of the new Diocese of Houma-Thibodaux in Louisiana from 1977 to 1992

Boudreaux previously served as bishop of the Diocese of Beaumont in Texas from 1971 to 1977 and as auxiliary bishop of the Diocese of Lafayette in Louisiana from 1962 to 1971.

Biography

Early life 
Warren Boudreaux was born on January 25, 1918, in Berwick, Louisiana, to Alphonse Louis and Loretta Marie (née Senac) Boudreaux, of French far ancestry. After graduating from Berwick Junior High School, he entered St. Joseph's Seminary in Saint Benedict, Louisiana.  Boudreaux then attended Notre Dame Seminary in New Orleans. He was later sent to Paris to study at the Seminary of Saint-Sulpice.

Priesthood 
Returning to Louisiana, he was ordained to the priesthood for the Diocese of Lafayette by Bishop Jules Benjamin Jeanmard on May 30, 1942. After his ordination, Boudreaux was assigned as a curate at St. Michael's Parish in Crowley, Louisiana. In 1943, he was sent to Washington D.C. to attend the Catholic University of America in Washington, D.C., earning a Doctor of Canon Law degree in 1946.

Returning to Louisiana in 1946, Boudreaux was appointed vice-chancellor of the diocese and secretary to Bishop Jeanmard.  In 1950, Boudreaux was named a papal chamberlain. In addition to these duties, he served as defender of the bond from 1947 to 1950 and officialis on the diocesan court from 1950 to 1954. Boudreaux was appointed pastor of St. Peter's Parish in New Iberia, Louisiana, a post he would hold until 1971.  He was named vicar general of the diocese in 1956 and was raised to the rank of domestic prelate in 1958.

Auxiliary Bishop of Lafayette 
On May 19, 1962, Boudreaux was appointed as an auxiliary bishop of the Diocese of Lafayette and titular bishop of Calynda by Pope John XXIII. He received his episcopal consecration on July 25, 1962, from Archbishop Egidio Vagnozzi, with Archbishop John Cody and Bishop Maurice Schexnayder serving as co-consecrators.

Bishop of Beaumont 
Boudreaux was named as the second bishop of the Diocese of Beaumont by Pope Paul VI on June 4, 1971. He was installed on August 25, 1971. After the end of the Vietnam War, the diocese received national recognition for its resettlement of refugees from what was then South Vietnam.  In 1974, Boudreaux began an outreach effort to people who made their living harvesting seafood and working on ships.

Bishop of Houma-Thibodaux 
Boudreaux was appointed the first bishop of the newly erected Diocese of Houma-Thibodaux on March 2, 1977 by Paul VI. He was installed on June 5, 1977.  He was well known for placing a ban on church fairs in 1985, objecting to the presence of alcohol and overall frivolity at such events.

Boudreaux's resignation as bishop of Houma-Thibodaux was accepted by Pope John Paul II on December 29, 1992. In 1995, Boudreaux published his autobiography, Memories of a Cajun Bishop.  Warren Boudreaux died in Thibodaux, Louisiana, from heart failure on October 6, 1997, at age 79.

References

Episcopal succession

1918 births
1997 deaths
Notre Dame Seminary alumni
Catholic University of America alumni
Seminary of Saint-Sulpice (France) alumni
People from Berwick, Louisiana
20th-century Roman Catholic bishops in the United States
People from New Iberia, Louisiana
Catholics from Louisiana